Riachuelo Futebol Clube, commonly known as Riachuelo, is a Brazilian football club based in Riachuelo, Sergipe state. They won the Campeonato Sergipano once.

History
The club was founded on June 11, 1933. They won the Campeonato Sergipano in 1941, and the Campeonato Sergipano Série A2 in 2002 and in 2009.

Achievements

 Campeonato Sergipano:
 Winners (1): 1941
 Campeonato Sergipano Série A2:
 Winners (2): 2002, 2009

Stadium
Riachuelo Futebol Clube play their home games at Estádio Francisco Leite. The stadium has a maximum capacity of 2,000 people.

References

Association football clubs established in 1933
Football clubs in Sergipe
1933 establishments in Brazil